MZM may refer to:
 Money with zero maturity
 Mozambican metical, the ISO 4217 code for the currency of Mozambique
 Metroid: Zero Mission, a video game
 The MZM Scandal, a bribery scandal involving MZM, inc.
 Mach–Zehnder modulator